Jihane Samlal (born November 25, 1983 in Dole, Jura, France) is a Moroccan slalom canoer. At the 2012 Summer Olympics she competed in the K-1 event, finishing 21st in the heats, failing to qualify for the semifinals.

References

Sports-Reference.com profile

Moroccan female canoeists
1983 births
Living people
Olympic canoeists of Morocco
Canoeists at the 2012 Summer Olympics